Alison Harvison Young is a judge of the Court of Appeal for Ontario, appointed to that Court on August 31, 2018. Prior to her appointment as a judge, Harvison Young was a legal academic in family law.

Harvison Young was appointed as a judge of the Superior Court of Justice of Ontario by the Canadian government on November 19, 2004. At the time of her appointment, Harvison Young was the dean of the Faculty of Law at Queen's University in Kingston, Ontario. She has also taught at Faculty of Law at McGill University and the University of Pennsylvania Law School.

Harvison Young earned LL.B. and B.C.L. degrees from McGill University in 1983 and a B.C.L. from Oxford University in 1988. She served as law clerk to Justice Willard Estey of the Supreme Court of Canada from 1983–1984.

Notes

Canadian legal scholars
Deans of law schools in Canada
Women deans (academic)
Living people
Academic staff of McGill University
Judges in Ontario
Alumni of the University of Oxford
Academic staff of Queen's University at Kingston
University of Pennsylvania faculty
Year of birth missing (living people)
Canadian women judges
Canadian academic administrators
Women legal scholars
McGill University Faculty of Law alumni